Wilhelm Rothmayer (born 18 December 1910, date of death unknown) was an Austrian long-distance runner. He competed in the marathon at the 1936 Summer Olympics.

References

1910 births
Year of death missing
Athletes (track and field) at the 1936 Summer Olympics
Austrian male long-distance runners
Austrian male marathon runners
Olympic athletes of Austria
Place of birth missing